The Augustus B. Patton House is a historic house in Ogden, Utah. It was built in 1891, before Utah became a state, for Augustus B. Patton, a lawyer and real estate developer who lived here until his death in 1911. The house was purchased by a series of homeowners until it was acquired in 1934 by S. Dilworth Young, a general authority in the Church of Jesus Christ of Latter-day Saints who served on the First Council of the Seventy and the First Quorum of Seventy; he remained the homeowner until 1955. The house was designed in the Shingle style architectural style. It has been listed on the National Register of Historic Places since February 19, 1982.

References

National Register of Historic Places in Weber County, Utah
Shingle Style architecture in Utah
Houses completed in 1891
1891 establishments in Utah Territory